Leslie Lyness (born August 7, 1968 in Paoli, Pennsylvania) is a former field hockey midfielder from the United States, who was a member of the US women's team that finished fifth at the 1996 Summer Olympics in Atlanta, Georgia. Her first selection came in 1990.
She won a bronze medal at the 1995 Pan American Games.

College
In 1990, while at North Carolina, Lyness won the Honda Award (now the Honda Sports Award) as the nation's best field hockey player.

References

External links
 
 USA Field Hockey

1968 births
Living people
Olympic field hockey players of the United States
American female field hockey players
North Carolina Tar Heels field hockey players
Field hockey players at the 1996 Summer Olympics
People from Chester County, Pennsylvania
The Baldwin School alumni
Pan American Games bronze medalists for the United States
Pan American Games medalists in field hockey
Field hockey players at the 1995 Pan American Games
Medalists at the 1995 Pan American Games
20th-century American women